The SERM (structured entity relationship model) is an amplification of the ERM which is commonly used for data modeling. It was first proposed from Prof. Dr. Elmar J. Sinz in 1988. The SERM is commonly used in the SAP-world for the data modeling.

Aims
 structuring of large schemes 
 visualization of existence dependency
 avoidance of inconsistencies
 avoidance of unnecessary relationshiptypes

SERM symbols

SERM example

 Customer and article are independent entities
 Every order is referred to one customer. Orders without customers are illegal (order is an ER type). Customers without any orders are legal because they are independent Entities. 
 To every order there is belonging at least one order item. 
 Every order item is related to exactly one order. 
 Every invoice is referred to one customer, as well. Invoices without customers are illegal. Customers without any invoice are legal.
 To every invoice there is belonging at least one invoice line item.
 Every invoice line item is related to exactly order item. An order item could be calculated or not.
 SERM is already in the third normal form

References

Data modeling
Diagrams
Modeling languages